The List of ships sunk at the Battle of Jutland is a list of ships which were lost during the Battle of Jutland.

This battle was fought between the British Royal Navy's Grand Fleet and the Imperial German Navy's High Seas Fleet on 31 May and 1 June 1916, during the First World War.  
The list is in chronological order of the time of sinking.

 Time-of-day versus "action" may vary, as some ships received their deadly damage during one action but limped through to a later time or even a later action.

Sources 
 
 
 Wrecksite - WARSHIPS LOST AT THE BATTLE OF JUTLAND
 North East Medals The Battle of Jutland 1916  - Casualties Listed by Ship.

External links
 Battle of Jutland Crew Lists Project

Ships sunk at the Battle of Jutland
Lists of World War I ships